The Circuit Courts (Scotland) Act 1709 (8 Ann c 16) was an Act of the Parliament of Great Britain.

The whole Act was repealed by section 70(2) of, and Schedule 2 to, the Criminal Justice (Scotland) Act 1987.

Section 1
In this section, the words of commencement were repealed by section 1 of, and Schedule 1 to, the Statute Law Revision Act 1948.

Section 2
This section was repealed by section 1 of, and Schedule 1 to, the Statute Law Revision Act 1948.

Section 3
This section was repealed by section 1 of, and the Schedule to, the Statute Law Revision Act 1867.

Section 4
This section was repealed by section 1 of, and Schedule 1 to, the Statute Law Revision Act 1948.

Section 6
This section was repealed by section 1 of, and Schedule 1 to, the Statute Law Revision Act 1948.

References
Halsbury's Statutes,

Great Britain Acts of Parliament 1709